The First Garment (Georgian: სამოსელი პირველი, Samoseli Pirveli) is a novel by Georgian writer Guram Dochanashvili which serves as a retelling of The Parable of the Lost Son from the Bible. The plot follows a young, inexperienced, adventure-seeking man named Domenico who is deeply affected by the appearance and stories of a mysterious refugee in his village, and thus decides to take his inheritance and leave the village to go on adventuring.

Synopsis
This novel is based on the motif of the Gospel parable of the Prodigal Son. Its main hero is Domenico, the younger son of the most powerful villager. He is greatly influenced by the story told by the fugitive, a person gripped by a mysterious fear. Domenic demands of his father his share of the inheritance and leaves to get to know the world. Over the years, Domenico meets many different people and gets caught up in the War of Canudos.

Themes 
In this novel, traditional motifs of good, evil, love, morality and the like are illuminated in a new light and unfold as dramatic narrative against a background of an odd merging of humour and aesthetics. There are many memorable characters in the novel. The narrative is easy-going and dynamic, and is accompanied by bold linguistic experiments that create a textual fabric that is utterly peerless and uniquely characteristic of Guram Dochanashvili.

References

1975 novels
20th-century Georgian novels
Georgian-language works
Novels by Guram Dochanashvili
Allegory
Adventure novels
Georgian magic realism novels